The Atelierhaus Salzamt (lit: "Studio House Salt Authority") is a cultural institution in the city of Linz, Austria founded in 2009. Its stated goal is to promote and support international exchange programs in the field of visual arts.
The house is located in the centre of Linz, directly on the southern bank of the Danube. It functions as an art gallery, an artists' residence, and a studio space for local and international artists.

History 
The building was constructed in 1706 as a Salzamt, an imperial authority that regulated the salt trade in Austria. Typical of its time and area, it has many baroque architectural features, like cross-vaulted ceilings. The outside walls are built on the former city walls and are up to two meters thick. The city of Linz undertook the four-million-euro renovation as part of the preparations for being named the European Capital of Culture for 2009. As the building is listed as a protected landmark, the renovation focused on the best possible preservation of the original building materials. The original stucco ceilings and wooden floorboards were preserved in many rooms. A basement was installed to house the building services and sanitary facilities, making the building suitable as a living space.

The Studio House 
The Atelierhaus Salzamt is a meeting place for young visual artists from Austria and abroad. A total of nine studios are available for use. Four international scholarship holders are each provided with a small apartment and their own studio free of charge for a maximum period of two months. In addition, international guest artists receive a monthly stipend to cover living costs. Studios and apartments are also rented out to the Province of Upper Austria, University of Art and Design Linz and Ars Electronica. Four further studios without apartments attached are given free of charge to local artists from Linz and Upper Austria.
In order to document the international artistic exchange and to engage with the public, there are regular exhibitions, lectures, discussions, presentations and screenings in the ground floor exhibition and event spaces.

References

External links 

 Atelierhaus Salzamt Linz on linz.at.
 blog Salzamt Linz official blog.

Buildings and structures in Linz
Austrian culture
Tourist attractions in Linz
Art museums and galleries in Austria